Rhyl Ladies Football Club, until 2016 known as Rhyl & Prestatyn Ladies Football Club and previously Prestatyn Ladies & Girls Football Club, are a women's association football club based in Rhyl, Denbighshire, Wales. They play their home matches at Rhyl F.C.'s Belle Vue Stadium.

History 
Prestatyn Ladies & Girls were founded in 2009 in Prestatyn by Tom Jamieson with a five-year plan to eventually reach the Welsh Premier Women's Football League. In 2014, Prestatyn Ladies & Girls won promotion from the North Wales League to the Welsh Premier Women's Football League by winning a play-off against the Ceredigion League's Aberystwyth University 10–0. Owing to ground regulations, the club moved away from Prestatyn and joined with Rhyl to play at Belle Vue Stadium. The club were also renamed Rhyl & Prestatyn Ladies as a result. Following the club's move to Rhyl, a new women's football club was set up in Prestatyn and became affiliated with Prestatyn Town F.C. which became known as Prestatyn Town Ladies in order to continue women's football in Prestatyn.

Following the disbandment of Wrexham Ladies F.C., a number of players moved to Rhyl & Prestatyn Ladies. Rhyl & Prestatyn Ladies along with Llandudno Ladies were the only teams from North Wales competing in the Welsh Premier Women's Football League with concerns expressed that they would be the main teams representing the region as North Wales League clubs had been dissuaded from applying for promotion due to the expense.

In August 2019, it was announced that Rhyl Ladies would be withdrawing from the Welsh Premier Women's League citing a lack of commitment to playing in a national league and were therefore unable to attract a team.

Youth 
Rhyl & Prestatyn Ladies run a number of youth teams. In 2016, their under 16 team won the North West Wales League title.

Current squad 
.

References 

Women's football clubs in Wales
Welsh Premier Women's Football League clubs
Sport in Denbighshire
Rhyl F.C.
Prestatyn
Rhyl